The 2012 The Hague Open was a professional tennis tournament played on clay courts. It was the 20th edition of the tournament which was part of the 2012 ATP Challenger Tour and the Tretorn SERIE+. It took place in Scheveningen, Netherlands between 9 and 15 July 2012.

Singles main draw entrants

Seeds

 1 Rankings are as of June 25, 2012.

Other entrants
The following players received wildcards into the singles main draw:
  Kimmer Coppejans
  Thiemo de Bakker
  Mark de Jong
  Matwé Middelkoop

The following players received entry from the qualifying draw:
  Rameez Junaid
  Thiago Monteiro
  Yuri Schukin
  Alexandre Sidorenko

Champions

Singles

 Jerzy Janowicz def.  Matwé Middelkoop, 6–2, 6–2

Doubles

 Antal van der Duim /  Boy Westerhof def.  Rameez Junaid /  Simon Stadler, 6–4, 5–7, [10–7]

External links
Official Website

The Hague Open
The Hague Open
2012 in Dutch tennis